Cercestis is a genus of flowering plants in the family Araceae. The species in this genus are all climbers and are endemic to Africa. At intervals along the stem they produce long leafless shoots called flagella. Many of the species in Cersestis show signs of fenestration.

Species 
Cercestis afzelii Schott - tropical West Africa from Senegal to Nigeria
Cercestis camerunensis (Ntépé-Nyamè) Bogner - Nigeria, Cameroon, Gabon
Cercestis congoensis Engl. -Angola, Zaire, Gabon, Congo-Brazzaville, Central African Republic, Cameroon
Cercestis dinklagei Engl. - Zaire, Gulf of Guinea Islands, Gabon, Congo-Brazzaville, Cameroon, Nigeria, Sierra Leone, Liberia, Ivory Coast 
Cercestis hepperi Jongkind - Liberia
Cercestis ivorensis A.Chev - Sierra Leone, Liberia, Ivory Coast, Cameroon, Gabon
Cercestis kamerunianus (Engl.) N.E.Br. - Nigeria, Cameroon, Gabon
Cercestis mirabilis (N.E.Br.) Bogner - tropical West Africa  from Benin to Angola
Cercestis sagittatus Engl. - Liberia, Ivory Coast
Cercestis taiensis Bogner & Knecht  - Liberia, Ivory Coast

References 

Aroideae
Araceae genera
Flora of Africa